Anthony Chelín Uribe Francia (born 24 October 1990) is a Venezuelan professional footballer who plays as a forward for Deportivo Táchira.

Career
Uribe began featuring for Caracas B in the Segunda División in 2008, subsequently scoring eight goals in sixteen appearances. In 2009, Uribe moved up to the club's senior team in the Venezuelan Primera División. One goal in five matches followed in the 2009–10 campaign which Caracas ended as champions. He played for two further seasons, via a loan with Llaneros, adding six goals to his tally. In June 2012, Atlético Venezuela completed the loan signing of Uribe. He ended up remaining for five campaigns in the top-flight, notching twenty-five goals in one hundred and twenty fixtures in all competitions.

Ahead of the 2017 Venezuelan Primera División, Uribe joined reigning champions Zamora. He scored twenty-two times across 2017 and 2018, including braces against Atlético Socopó, Deportivo Táchira, Metropolitanos and, on two occasions, Portuguesa. In January 2019, Uribe departed his homeland to join Argentine Primera División side Belgrano on loan. After just three appearances in all competitions for Belgrano, Uribe went on to join Rionegro Águilas in Colombia. He scored three goals in his first three league fixtures, netting against Junior, América de Cali and Independiente Medellín in August 2019.

In June 2020, Uribe left Rionegro Águilas after the expiration of his contract. However, in the succeeding January, Uribe made a return to the club; having been without a club since his departure.

Career statistics
.

Honours
Caracas
Venezuelan Primera División: 2009–10

Zamora
Venezuelan Primera División: 2018 liberdade

References

External links

1990 births
Living people
People from La Guaira
Venezuelan footballers
Association football forwards
Venezuelan expatriate footballers
Expatriate footballers in Argentina
Expatriate footballers in Colombia
Venezuelan expatriate sportspeople in Argentina
Venezuelan expatriate sportspeople in Colombia
Venezuelan Segunda División players
Venezuelan Primera División players
Argentine Primera División players
Caracas FC players
Llaneros de Guanare players
Atlético Venezuela C.F. players
Zamora FC players
Club Atlético Belgrano footballers
Águilas Doradas Rionegro players
20th-century Venezuelan people
21st-century Venezuelan people